Dobroč is a village and municipality in the Lučenec District in the Banská Bystrica Region of Slovakia.

History
In historical records, the village was first mentioned in 1393  (Dobrocha)  as belonging to Divín castle.

Genealogical resources

The records for genealogical research are available at the state archive "Statny Archiv in Banska Bystrica, Slovakia"

 Roman Catholic church records (births/marriages/deaths): 1688-1895 (parish B)
 Lutheran church records (births/marriages/deaths): 1806-1896 (parish B)

See also
 List of municipalities and towns in Slovakia

External links
 
 
https://web.archive.org/web/20071116010355/http://www.statistics.sk/mosmis/eng/run.html
http://www.e-obce.sk/obec/dobroc/dobroc.html
Surnames of living people in Dobroc

Villages and municipalities in Lučenec District